Sam Puckett may refer to:
 Sam Puckett (iCarly), a fictional character on the Nickelodeon television series iCarly
 Sam Puckett (Sam & Cat), the same character as she appears on the Nickelodeon television series Sam & Cat